Lists of Bible pericopes itemize Bible stories or pericopes of the Bible. They include stories from the Hebrew Bible and from the Christian New Testament.

 List of Hebrew Bible events
 List of New Testament pericopes 
 Gospel harmony#A parallel harmony presentation
 Acts of the Apostles#Outline
 Events of Revelation

External links
 Great Stories of the Bible - an index of bible stories in the Christian Bible (Old Testament & New Testament)